The 2019 Unibet European Championship was the twelfth edition of the Professional Darts Corporation's European Championship tournament, which saw the top players from the thirteen European tour events compete against each other. The tournament took place from 24–27 October 2019 at the Lokhalle in Göttingen, Germany.

James Wade was the defending champion, after beating Simon Whitlock 11–8 in the 2018 final. However, he was beaten 6–0 by Jonny Clayton in the first round. Clayton posted the 6th highest average in the tournament's history in the process.

Rob Cross won his third major title with an 11–6 win over Gerwyn Price in the final.

Prize money
The 2019 European Championship will have a total prize fund of £500,000, an increase of £100,000 from the last staging of the tournament.

The following is the breakdown of the fund:

Qualification
The 2019 tournament continues the new system in terms of qualification with the two previous editions: The top 32 players from the European Tour Order of Merit, which is solely based on prize money won in the thirteen European tour events during the season, qualifying for the tournament.

As with 2018's tournament, the draw will be done in a fixed bracket by their seeded order with the top qualifier playing the 32nd, the second playing the 31st and so on.

The following players qualified for the tournament:

Draw

References

2019
2019 European Championship (darts)
2019 in darts
2019 in German sport
October 2019 sports events in Germany